The Distance is the twelfth studio album by US-American rock singer Bob Seger.  It was released in the final week of 1982 (see 1982 in music).  It peaked at #5 on Billboards album chart and sold close to two million copies in the United States.

Seger, influenced by the Woody Allen film Annie Hall, originally intended the album to be built around the theme of relationships but eventually that fell apart when Seger decided that sticking to the theme too strictly would make the album "maudlin".  Several songs based on the original theme made it on the album: the hit single "Even Now", "Love’s the Last to Know", "House Behind a House" and the album closer "Little Victories".

The album's lead single, "Shame on the Moon", was one of Seger's biggest hits, holding at #2 for four weeks on the Billboard Hot 100.  It also hit #1 Adult Contemporary and crossed over to #15 Country.

Capitol Records had stopped manufacturing albums in the 8-track tape cartridge format by the time this album was released.  However, Seger asked the label to include that format for this album, knowing that many of his fans still used 8-track players.

Track listing

Personnel

 Bob Seger – vocals (all tracks), guitar (3, 8, 9), harmony vocals (4)

The Silver Bullet Band

Chris Campbell – bass (1–7, 9)
Craig Frost – organ (1, 3–6, 9), piano (2)
Alto Reed – saxophone (1–3, 7, 8) 

Muscle Shoals Rhythm Section

 Barry Beckett – piano (8), organ (8)
 Pete Carr – guitar (8)
 Roger Hawkins – drums (8)
 David Hood – bass (8)
 Randy McCormick – electric piano (8)

Additional musicians
Drew Abbott – guitar (2, 4)
Roy Bittan – piano (1, 6)
Michael Boddicker – synthesizer (6)
Don Felder – guitar (1, 3)
Bobbye Hall – percussion (1–4, 6)
Davey Johnstone – guitar (5)
Danny Kortchmar – guitar (7)
Russ Kunkel – drums (1–7, 9)
Bill Payne – piano (4, 5), synthesizer (8)
Waddy Wachtel – guitar (2, 4, 6, 7, 9)

Additional vocals
Ginger Blake – background vocals (8)
Laura Creamer – background vocals (4, 8)
Linda Dillard – background vocals (8)
Glenn Frey – harmony vocals (4)
Shaun Murphy – background vocals (4, 7)
Bonnie Raitt – harmony vocals (2)
Joan Sliwin – background vocals (4)

Production

Producer: Jimmy Iovine
Engineer: Shelly Yakus

Charts
Album

Singles

References

Bob Seger albums
1982 albums
Albums produced by Jimmy Iovine
Albums recorded at Muscle Shoals Sound Studio
Capitol Records albums